The British Motorcycle Racing Club (BMCRC), informally Bemsee, is the largest motorcycle racing club of its type in the UK and organises a range of championships including Clubman and Supersport 600, Thunderbikes, Superstock 1000, Formula 400s and sidecars.

History
Founded in 1909, it was originally based at the classic Brooklands circuit near Weybridge in Surrey. During the 1960s the offices were at Kingston, Surrey and are now located in Romford, Essex. It is the oldest motorcycle racing club in the world.

Many champions have emerged from starting out in the homemade Aprilia Superteens championship
for example:

Two Time world superbike champion James Toseland
Double MotoGP champion Casey Stoner
Moto2 Racer Bradley Smith
Moto3 Racer Danny Webb
MotoGP Racer and 2009 Supersport Champion Cal Crutchlow

Racing Classes (2019) 
In 2019, the BMCRC had classes available, based on machine type and rider age. Some classes also had sub-classes determined by various factors such as rider licence level (such as Clubman and National) or machine configuration:
 BMZRC 250 MZ
"Blue Haze" GP 2-Strokes
 RKB-F1/BMCRC F1 & F2 Sidecars
 BMCRC Formula 400
 MRO 600
 MRO Minitwins
 MRO Powerbikes & Clubman 1000
 ACU Team Green Junior Cup/Senior Ninja Series
 BMCRC Rookie 600 & Rookie 1000 Open
 BMCRC Thunderbike Sport, Thunderbike Extreme & Thunderbike Ultra
 Yamaha Past Masters
 Junior Supersport

Circuits
BMCRC leased the Lydden Hill circuit from 1993 to 2007. 
The 2022 season uses the following circuits:
 Brands Hatch (Indy and GP circuits)
 Snetterton
 Silverstone
 Oulton Park
 Donington Park
 Cadwell Park

References

External links
 Bemsee.net Official site

Motorcycle racing organizations
Motorcycle racing in the United Kingdom